A laptop computer or notebook computer, also known as a laptop or notebook for short, is a small, portable personal computer (PC). Laptops typically have a clamshell form factor with a flat panel screen (usually  in diagonal size) on the inside of the upper lid and an alphanumeric keyboard and pointing device (such as a trackpad and/or trackpoint) on the inside of the lower lid, although 2-in-1 PCs with a detachable keyboard are often marketed as laptops or as having a "laptop mode". Most of the computer's internal hardware is fitted inside the lower lid enclosure under the keyboard, although many laptops have a built-in webcam at the top of the screen and some modern ones even feature a touch-screen display. In most cases, unlike table computers which run on mobile operating systems, laptops tend to run on desktop operating systems which have been traditionally associated with desktop computers.

Laptops run on both an AC power supply and a rechargeable battery pack and can be folded shut for convenient storage and transportation, making them suitable for mobile use. Today, laptops are used in a variety of settings, such as at work (especially on business trips), in education, for playing games, web browsing, for personal multimedia, and for general home computer use.

The names "laptop" and "notebook" refer to the fact that the computer can be practically placed on (or on top of) the user's lap and can be used similarly to a notebook. As of 2022, in American English, the terms "laptop" and "notebook" are used interchangeably; in other dialects of English, one or the other may be preferred. Although the term "notebook" originally referred to a specific size of laptop (originally smaller and lighter than mainstream laptops of the time), the term has come to mean the same thing and no longer refers to any specific size.

Laptops combine many desktop components and capabilities into a single unit, including the central processing unit (CPU), random-access memory (RAM), hard disk drive (HDD) or solid-state drive (SSD), and graphics processing unit (GPU). Most modern laptops include a built-in webcam and microphone, and many also have touchscreens. Laptops can be powered by an internal battery or an external power supply by using an AC adapter. Hardware specifications may vary significantly between different types, models, and price points.

Design elements, form factors, and construction can also vary significantly between models depending on the intended use. Examples of specialized models of laptops include rugged notebooks for use in construction or military applications, as well as low-production-cost laptops such as those from the One Laptop per Child (OLPC) organization, which incorporate features like solar charging and semi-flexible components not found on most laptop computers. Portable computers, which later developed into modern laptops, were originally considered to be a small niche market, mostly for specialized field applications, such as in the military, for accountants, or traveling sales representatives. As portable computers evolved into modern laptops, they became widely used for a variety of purposes.

History

As the personal computer (PC) became feasible in 1971, the idea of a portable personal computer soon followed. A "personal, portable information manipulator" was imagined by Alan Kay at Xerox PARC in 1968, and described in his 1972 paper as the "Dynabook". The IBM Special Computer APL Machine Portable (SCAMP) was demonstrated in 1973. This prototype was based on the IBM PALM processor. The IBM 5100, the first commercially available portable computer, appeared in September 1975, and was based on the SCAMP prototype.

As 8-bit CPU machines became widely accepted, the number of portables increased rapidly. The first "laptop-sized notebook computer" was the Epson HX-20, invented (patented) by Suwa Seikosha's Yukio Yokozawa in July 1980, introduced at the COMDEX computer show in Las Vegas by Japanese company Seiko Epson in 1981, and released in July 1982. It had an LCD screen, a rechargeable battery, and a calculator-size printer, in a  chassis, the size of an A4 notebook. It was described as a "laptop" and "notebook" computer in its patent.

The portable micro computer Portal of the French company R2E Micral CCMC officially appeared in September 1980 at the Sicob show in Paris. It was a portable microcomputer designed and marketed by the studies and developments department of R2E Micral at the request of the company CCMC specializing in payroll and accounting. It was equipped with a central 64 KB RAM, a keyboard with 58 alphanumeric keys and 11 numeric keys (separate blocks), a 32-character screen, a floppy disk: capacity = 140,000 characters, of a thermal printer: speed = 28 characters / second, an asynchronous channel, asynchronous channel, a 220 V power supply. It provided total mobility. Its operating system was aptly named Prologue.

It had no battery, a  cathode-ray tube (CRT) screen, and dual  single-density floppy drives. Both Tandy/RadioShack and Hewlett-Packard (HP) also produced portable computers of varying designs during this period. The first laptops using the flip form factor appeared in the early 1980s. The Dulmont Magnum was released in Australia in 1981–82, but was not marketed internationally until 1984–85. The  GRiD Compass 1101, released in 1982, was used at NASA and by the military, among others. The Sharp PC-5000, Ampere and Gavilan SC released in 1983. The Gavilan SC was described as a "laptop" by its manufacturer, while the Ampere had a modern clamshell design. The Toshiba T1100 won acceptance not only among PC experts but the mass market as a way to have PC portability.
 
From 1983 onward, several new input techniques were developed and included in laptops, including the touch pad (Gavilan SC, 1983), the pointing stick (IBM ThinkPad 700, 1992), and handwriting recognition (Linus Write-Top, 1987). Some CPUs, such as the 1990 Intel i386SL, were designed to use minimum power to increase battery life of portable computers and were supported by dynamic power management features such as Intel SpeedStep and AMD PowerNow! in some designs.

Displays reached 640x480 (VGA) resolution by 1988 (Compaq SLT/286), and color screens started becoming a common upgrade in 1991, with increases in resolution and screen size occurring frequently until the introduction of 17" screen laptops in 2003. Hard drives started to be used in portables, encouraged by the introduction of 3.5" drives in the late 1980s, and became common in laptops starting with the introduction of 2.5" and smaller drives around 1990; capacities have typically lagged behind physically larger desktop drives.

Common resolutions of laptop webcams are 720p (HD), and in lower-end laptops 480p. The earliest known laptops with 1080p (Full HD) webcams like the Samsung 700G7C were released in the early 2010s.

Optical disc drives became common in full-size laptops around 1997; this initially consisted of CD-ROM drives, which were supplanted by CD-R, DVD, and Blu-ray drives with writing capability over time. Starting around 2011, the trend shifted against internal optical drives, and as of 2022, they have largely disappeared, but are still readily available as external peripherals.

Etymology
While the terms laptop and notebook are used interchangeably today, there are some questions as to the original etymology and specificity of either term. The term laptop appears to have been coined in the early 1980s to describe a mobile computer which could be used on one's lap, and to distinguish these devices from earlier and much heavier portable computers (informally called "luggables"). The term notebook appears to have gained currency somewhat later as manufacturers started producing even smaller portable devices, further reducing their weight and size and incorporating a display roughly the size of A4 paper; these were marketed as notebooks to distinguish them from bulkier mainstream or desktop replacement laptops.

Types of laptops 

Since the introduction of portable computers during the late 1970s, their form has changed significantly, spawning a variety of visually and technologically differing subclasses. Except where there is a distinct legal trademark around a term (notably, Ultrabook), there are rarely hard distinctions between these classes and their usage has varied over time and between different sources. Since the late 2010s, the use of more specific terms has become less common, with sizes distinguished largely by the size of the screen.

Smaller and larger laptops

There were in the past a number of marketing categories for smaller and larger laptop computers; these included "subnotebook" models, low cost "netbooks", and "ultra-mobile PCs" where the size class overlapped with devices like smartphone and handheld tablets, and "Desktop replacement" laptops for machines notably larger and heavier than typical to operate more powerful processors or graphics hardware. All of these terms have fallen out of favor as the size of mainstream laptops has gone down and their capabilities have gone up; except for niche models, laptop sizes tend to be distinguished by the size of the screen, and for more powerful models, by any specialized purpose the machine is intended for, such as a "gaming laptop" or a "mobile workstation" for professional use.

Convertible, hybrid, 2-in-1

The latest trend of technological convergence in the portable computer industry spawned a broad range of devices, which combined features of several previously separate device types. The hybrids, convertibles, and 2-in-1s emerged as crossover devices, which share traits of both tablets and laptops. All such devices have a touchscreen display designed to allow users to work in a tablet mode, using either multi-touch gestures or a stylus/digital pen.

Convertibles are devices with the ability to conceal a hardware keyboard. Keyboards on such devices can be flipped, rotated, or slid behind the back of the chassis, thus transforming from a laptop into a tablet. Hybrids have a keyboard detachment mechanism, and due to this feature, all critical components are situated in the part with the display. 2-in-1s can have a hybrid or a convertible form, often dubbed 2-in-1 detachable and 2-in-1 convertibles respectively, but are distinguished by the ability to run a desktop OS, such as Windows 10. 2-in-1s are often marketed as laptop replacement tablets.

2-in-1s are designed to be used not only as a media consumption device but also as valid desktop or laptop replacements, due to their ability to run desktop applications, such as Adobe Photoshop. It is possible to connect multiple peripheral devices, such as a mouse, keyboard, and several external displays to a modern 2-in-1.

Microsoft Surface Pro-series devices and Surface Book are examples of modern 2-in-1 detachable, whereas Lenovo Yoga-series computers are a variant of 2-in-1 convertibles. While the older Surface RT and Surface 2 have the same chassis design as the Surface Pro, their use of ARM processors and Windows RT do not classify them as 2-in-1s, but as hybrid tablets. Similarly, a number of hybrid laptops run a mobile operating system, such as Android. These include Asus's Transformer Pad devices, examples of hybrids with a detachable keyboard design, which do not fall in the category of 2-in-1s.

Rugged laptop

A rugged laptop is designed to reliably operate in harsh usage conditions such as strong vibrations, extreme temperatures, and wet or dusty environments. Rugged laptops are bulkier, heavier, and much more expensive than regular laptops, and thus are seldom seen in regular consumer use.

Hardware

The basic components of laptops function identically to their desktop counterparts. Traditionally they were miniaturized and adapted to mobile use, The design restrictions on power, size, and cooling of laptops limit the maximum performance of laptop parts compared to that of desktop components, although that difference has increasingly narrowed.

In general, laptop components are not intended to be replaceable or upgradable by the end-user, except for components that can be detached; in the past, batteries and optical drives were commonly exchangeable. This restriction is one of the major differences between laptops and desktop computers, because the large "tower" cases used in desktop computers are designed so that new motherboards, hard disks, sound cards, RAM, and other components can be added. Memory and storage can often be upgraded with some disassembly, but with the most compact laptops, there may be no upgradeable components at all.

The following sections summarizes the differences and distinguishing features of laptop components in comparison to desktop personal computer parts.

Display
The typical laptop has a screen that, when unfolded, is upright to the user.

Screen technology 
Laptop screens most commonly employ liquid-crystal display (LCD) technology, although use of OLED panels has risen substantially since 2020. The display interfaces with the motherboard using the Low-voltage differential signaling (LVDS) or embedded DisplayPort protocol.

Surface finish 
Externally, it can be a glossy or a matte (anti-glare) screen.

Sizes 
In the past, there was a broader range of marketing terms (both formal and informal) to distinguish between different sizes of laptops. These included Netbooks, subnotebooks, Ultra-mobile PC, and Desktop replacement computers; these are sometimes still used informally, although they are essentially dead in terms of manufacturer marketing.

As of 2021, mainstream consumer laptops tend to come with 11", 13" or 15"-16" screens; 14" models are more popular among business machines. Larger and smaller models are available, but less common – there is no clear dividing line in minimum or maximum size. Machines small enough to be handheld (screens in the 6–8" range) can be marketed either as very small laptops or "handheld PCs," while the distinction between the largest laptops and "All-in-One" desktops is whether they fold for travel.

Resolution 
Having a higher resolution display allows more items to fit onscreen at a time, improving the user's ability to multitask, although at the higher resolutions on smaller screens, the resolution may only serve to display sharper graphics and text rather than increasing the usable area. Since the introduction of the MacBook Pro with Retina display in 2012, there has been an increase in the availability of "HiDPI" (or high Pixel density) displays; as of 2022, this is generally considered to be anything higher than 1920 pixels wide. This has increasingly converged around 4K (3840-pixel-wide) resolutions.

External displays can be connected to most laptops, with most models supporting at least one. The use of technology such as USB4 (section Alternate Mode partner specifications)|DisplayPort Alt Mode]] has been utilized to charge a laptop and provide display output over one USB-C Cable.

Refresh rates 
Most laptop displays have a maximum refresh rate of 60Hz. The Dell M17x and Samsung 700G7A, both released in 2011, were among the first laptops to feature a 120Hz refresh rate, and more such laptops have appeared in the years since.

Central processing unit (CPU)
A laptop's CPU  has advanced power-saving features and produces less heat than one intended purely for desktop use. Mainstream laptop CPUs made after 2018 have at least two processor cores, often four cores, and sometimes more, with 8 cores becoming more common.

For the low price and mainstream performance, there is no longer a significant performance difference between laptop and desktop CPUs, but at the high end, the fastest desktop CPUs still substantially outperform the fastest laptop processors, at the expense of massively higher power consumption and heat generation; the fastest laptop processors top out at 56 watts of heat, while the fastest desktop processors top out at 150 watts (and often need water cooling).

There has been a wide range of CPUs designed for laptops available from both Intel, AMD, and other manufacturers. On non-x86 architectures, Motorola and IBM produced the chips for the former PowerPC-based Apple laptops (iBook and PowerBook). Between around 2000 to 2014, most full-size laptops had socketed, replaceable CPUs; on thinner models, the CPU was soldered on the motherboard and was not replaceable or upgradable without replacing the motherboard. Since 2015, Intel has not offered new laptop CPU models with pins to be interchangeable, preferring ball grid array chip packages which have to be soldered; and as of 2021, only a few rare models using desktop parts.

In the past, some laptops have used a desktop processor instead of the laptop version and have had high-performance gains at the cost of greater weight, heat, and limited battery life; this is not unknown as of 2022, but since around 2010, the practice has been restricted to small-volume gaming models. Laptop CPUs are rarely able to be overclocked; most use locked processors. Even on gaming models where unlocked processors are available, the cooling system in most laptops is often very close to its limits and there is rarely headroom for an overclocking–related operating temperature increase.

Graphics processing unit (GPU)
On most laptops, the GPU is integrated into the CPU to conserve power and space. This was introduced by Intel with the Core i-series of mobile processors in 2010, followed by similar AMD APU processors in January 2011.

Before that, lower-end machines tended to use graphics processors integrated into the system chipset, while higher-end machines had a separate graphics processor. In the past, laptops lacking a separate graphics processor were limited in their utility for gaming and professional applications involving 3D graphics, but the capabilities of CPU-integrated graphics have converged with the low-end of dedicated graphics processors since the mid-2010s. For laptops posessing limited onboard graphics capability but sufficient I/O throughput, an external GPU (eGPU) can provide additional graphics power at the cost of physical space and portability.

Higher-end laptops intended for gaming or professional 3D work still come with dedicated (and in some cases even dual) graphics processors on the motherboard or as an internal expansion card. Since 2011, these almost always involve switchable graphics so that when there is no demand for the higher performance dedicated graphics processor, the more power-efficient integrated graphics processor will be used. Nvidia Optimus and AMD Hybrid Graphics are examples of this sort of system of switchable graphics.

Traditionally, the system RAM on laptops (as well as on desktop computers) was physically separate from the graphics memory used by the GPU. Apple's M series SoCs feature a unified pool of memory for both the system and the GPU; this approach can produce substantial efficiency gains for some applications but comes at the cost of eGPU support.

Memory
Since around the year 2000, most laptops have used SO-DIMM RAM, although, as of 2021, an increasing number of models use memory soldered to the motherboard. Before 2000, most laptops used proprietary memory modules if their memory was upgradable.

In the early 2010s, high end laptops such as the 2011 Samsung 700G7A have passed the 10 GB RAM barrier, featuring 16 GB of RAM.

When upgradeable, memory slots are sometimes accessible from the bottom of the laptop for ease of upgrading; in other cases, accessing them requires significant disassembly. Most laptops have two memory slots, although some will have only one, either for cost savings or because some amount of memory is soldered. Some high-end models have four slots; these are usually mobile engineering workstations, although a few high-end models intended for gaming do as well.

As of 2021, 8 GB RAM is most common, with lower-end models occasionally having 4GB. Higher-end laptops may come with 16 GB of RAM or more.

Internal storage
The earliest laptops most often used floppy disk for storage, although a few used either RAM disk or tape, by the late 1980s hard disk drives had become the standard form of storage.

Between 1990 and 2009, almost all laptops typically had a hard disk drive (HDD) for storage; since then, solid-state drives (SSD) have gradually come to supplant hard drives in all but some inexpensive consumer models. Solid-state drives are faster and more power-efficient, as well as eliminating the hazard of drive and data corruption caused by a laptop's physical impacts, as they use no mechanical parts such as a rotational platter. In many cases, they are more compact as well. Initially, in the late 2000s, SSDs were substantially more expensive than HDDs, but as of 2021 prices on smaller capacity (under 1 terabyte) drives have converged; larger capacity drives remain more expensive than comparable-sized HDDs.

Since around 1990, where a hard drive is present it will typically be a 2.5-inch drive; some very compact laptops support even smaller 1.8-inch HDDs, and a very small number used 1" Microdrives. Some SSDs are built to match the size/shape of a laptop hard drive, but increasingly they have been replaced with smaller mSATA or M.2 cards. SSDs using the newer and much faster NVM Express standard for connecting are only available as cards.

As of 2022, many laptops no longer contain space for a 2.5" drive, accepting only M.2 cards; a few of the smallest have storage soldered to the motherboard. For those that can, they can typically contain a single 2.5-inch drive, but a small number of laptops with a screen wider than 15 inches can house two drives.

A variety of external HDDs or NAS data storage servers with support of RAID technology can be attached to virtually any laptop over such interfaces as USB, FireWire, eSATA, or Thunderbolt, or over a wired or wireless network to further increase space for the storage of data. Many laptops also incorporate a SD or microSD card slot. This enables users to download digital pictures from an SD card onto a laptop, thus enabling them to delete the SD card's contents to free up space for taking new pictures.

Removable media drive
Optical disc drives capable of playing CD-ROMs, compact discs (CD), DVDs, and in some cases, Blu-ray discs (BD), were nearly universal on full-sized models between the mid-1990s and the early 2010s. As of 2021, drives are uncommon in compact or premium laptops; they remain available in some bulkier models, but the trend towards thinner and lighter machines is gradually eliminating these drives and players – when needed they can be connected via USB instead.

Inputs

An alphanumeric keyboard is used to enter text, data, and other commands (e.g., function keys). A touchpad (also called a trackpad), a pointing stick, or both, are used to control the position of the cursor on the screen, and an integrated keyboard is used for typing. Some touchpads have buttons separate from the touch surface, while others share the surface. A quick double-tap is typically registered as a click, and operating systems may recognize multi-finger touch gestures.

An external keyboard and mouse may be connected using a USB port or wirelessly, via Bluetooth or similar technology. Some laptops have multitouch touchscreen displays, either available as an option or standard. Most laptops have webcams and microphones, which can be used to communicate with other people with both moving images and sound, via web conferencing or video-calling software.

Laptops typically have USB ports and a combined headphone/microphone jack, for use with headphones, a combined headset, or an external mic. Many laptops have a card reader for reading digital camera SD cards.

Input/output (I/O) ports
On a typical laptop there are several USB ports; if they use only the older USB connectors instead of USB-C, they will typically have an external monitor port (VGA, DVI, HDMI or Mini DisplayPort or occasionally more than one), an audio in/out port (often in form of a single socket) is common. It is possible to connect up to three external displays to a 2014-era laptop via a single Mini DisplayPort, using multi-stream transport technology.

Apple, in a 2015 version of its MacBook, transitioned from a number of different I/O ports to a single USB-C port. This port can be used both for charging and connecting a variety of devices through the use of aftermarket adapters. Apple has since transitioned back to using a number of different ports. Google, with its updated version of Chromebook Pixel, shows a similar transition trend towards USB-C, although keeping older USB Type-A ports for a better compatibility with older devices. Although being common until the end of the 2000s decade, Ethernet network port are rarely found on modern laptops, due to widespread use of wireless networking, such as Wi-Fi. Legacy ports such as a PS/2 keyboard/mouse port, serial port, parallel port, or FireWire are provided on some models, but they are increasingly rare. On Apple's systems, and on a handful of other laptops, there are also Thunderbolt ports, but Thunderbolt 3 uses USB-C. Laptops typically have a headphone jack, so that the user can connect headphones or amplified speaker systems for listening to music or other audio.

Expansion cards
In the past, a PC Card (formerly PCMCIA) or ExpressCard slot for expansion was often present on laptops to allow adding and removing functionality, even when the laptop is powered on; these are becoming increasingly rare since the introduction of USB 3.0. Some internal subsystems such as Ethernet, Wi-Fi, or a wireless cellular modem can be implemented as replaceable internal expansion cards, usually accessible under an access cover on the bottom of the laptop. The standard for such cards is PCI Express, which comes in both mini and even smaller M.2 sizes. In newer laptops, it is not uncommon to also see Micro SATA (mSATA) functionality on PCI Express Mini or M.2 card slots allowing the use of those slots for SATA-based solid-state drives.

Battery and power supply

Since the late 1990s, laptops have typically used lithium ion or lithium polymer batteries, These replaced the older nickel metal-hydride typically used in the 1990s, and nickel–cadmium batteries used in most of the earliest laptops. A few of the oldest laptops used non-rechargeable batteries, or lead–acid batteries.

Battery life is highly variable by model and workload and can range from one hour to nearly a day. A battery's performance gradually decreases over time; a noticeable reduction in capacity is typically evident after two to three years of regular use, depending on the charging and discharging pattern and the design of the battery. Innovations in laptops and batteries have seen situations in which the battery can provide up to 24 hours of continued operation, assuming average power consumption levels. An example is the HP EliteBook 6930p when used with its ultra-capacity battery.

Laptops with removable batteries may support larger replacement batteries with extended capacity.

A laptop's battery is charged using an external power supply, which is plugged into a wall outlet. The power supply outputs a DC voltage typically in the range of 7.2—24 volts. The power supply is usually external and connected to the laptop through a DC connector cable. In most cases, it can charge the battery and power the laptop simultaneously. When the battery is fully charged, the laptop continues to run on power supplied by the external power supply, avoiding battery use. If the used power supply is not strong enough to power computing components and charge the battery simultaneously, the battery may charge in a shorter period of time if the laptop is turned off or sleeping. Most 2016-era laptops use a smart battery, a rechargeable battery pack with a built-in battery management system (BMS). The smart battery can internally measure voltage and current, and deduce charge level and State of Health (SoH) parameters, indicating the state of the cells.

Power connectors 

Historically, DC connectors, typically cylindrical/barrel-shaped coaxial power connectors have been used in laptops. Some vendors such as Lenovo made intermittent use of a rectangular connector.

Some connector heads feature a center pin to allow the end device to determine the power supply type by measuring the resistance between it and the connector's negative pole (outer surface). Vendors may block charging if a power supply is not recognized as original part, which could deny the legitimate use of universal third-party chargers.

With the advent of USB-C, portable electronics made increasing use of it for both power delivery and data transfer. Its support for 20 V (common laptop power supply voltage) and 5 A typically suffices for low to mid-end laptops, but some with higher power demands such as gaming laptops depend on dedicated DC connectors to handle currents beyond 5 A without risking overheating, some even above 10 A. Additionally, dedicated DC connectors are more durable and less prone to wear and tear from frequent reconnection, as their design is less delicate.

Cooling
Waste heat from the operation is difficult to remove in the compact internal space of a laptop. The earliest laptops used passive cooling; this gave way to heat sinks placed directly on the components to be cooled, but when these hot components are deep inside the device, a large space-wasting air duct is needed to exhaust the heat. Modern laptops instead rely on heat pipes to rapidly move waste heat towards the edges of the device, to allow for a much smaller and compact fan and heat sink cooling system. Waste heat is usually exhausted away from the device operator towards the rear or sides of the device. Multiple air intake paths are used since some intakes can be blocked, such as when the device is placed on a soft conforming surface like a chair cushion. Secondary device temperature monitoring may reduce performance or trigger an emergency shutdown if it is unable to dissipate heat, such as if the laptop were to be left running and placed inside a carrying case. Aftermarket cooling pads with external fans can be used with laptops to reduce operating temperatures.

Docking station

A docking station (sometimes referred to simply as a dock) is a laptop accessory that contains multiple ports and in some cases expansion slots or bays for fixed or removable drives. A laptop connects and disconnects to a docking station, typically through a single large proprietary connector. A docking station is an especially popular laptop accessory in a corporate computing environment, due to a possibility of a docking station transforming a laptop into a full-featured desktop replacement, yet allowing for its easy release. This ability can be advantageous to "road warrior" employees who have to travel frequently for work, and yet who also come into the office. If more ports are needed, or their position on a laptop is inconvenient, one can use a cheaper passive device known as a port replicator. These devices mate to the connectors on the laptop, such as through USB or FireWire.

Charging trolleys
Laptop charging trolleys, also known as laptop trolleys or laptop carts, are mobile storage containers to charge multiple laptops, netbooks, and tablet computers at the same time. The trolleys are used in schools that have replaced their traditional static computer labs suites of desktop equipped with "tower" computers, but do not have enough plug sockets in an individual classroom to charge all of the devices. The trolleys can be wheeled between rooms and classrooms so that all students and teachers in a particular building can access fully charged IT equipment.

Laptop charging trolleys are also used to deter and protect against opportunistic and organized theft. Schools, especially those with open plan designs, are often prime targets for thieves who steal high-value items. Laptops, netbooks, and tablets are among the highest–value portable items in a school. Moreover, laptops can easily be concealed under clothing and stolen from buildings. Many types of laptop–charging trolleys are designed and constructed to protect against theft. They are generally made out of steel, and the laptops remain locked up while not in use. Although the trolleys can be moved between areas from one classroom to another, they can often be mounted or locked to the floor, support pillars, or walls to prevent thieves from stealing the laptops, especially overnight.

Solar panels

In some laptops, solar panels are able to generate enough solar power for the laptop to operate. The One Laptop Per Child Initiative released the OLPC XO-1 laptop which was tested and successfully operated by use of solar panels. Presently, they are designing an OLPC XO-3 laptop with these features. The OLPC XO-3 can operate with 2 watts of electricity because its renewable energy resources generate a total of 4 watts. Samsung has also designed the NC215S solar–powered notebook that will be sold commercially in the U.S. market.

Accessories
A common accessory for laptops is a laptop sleeve, laptop skin, or laptop case, which provides a degree of protection from scratches. Sleeves, which are distinguished by being relatively thin and flexible, are most commonly made of neoprene, with sturdier ones made of low-resilience polyurethane. Some laptop sleeves are wrapped in ballistic nylon to provide some measure of waterproofing. Bulkier and sturdier cases can be made of metal with polyurethane padding inside and may have locks for added security. Metal, padded cases also offer protection against impacts and drops. Another common accessory is a laptop cooler, a device that helps lower the internal temperature of the laptop either actively or passively. A common active method involves using electric fans to draw heat away from the laptop, while a passive method might involve propping the laptop up on some type of pad so it can receive more airflow. Some stores sell laptop pads that enable a reclining person on a bed to use a laptop.

Modularity

Some of the components of earlier models of laptops can easily be replaced without opening completely its bottom part, such as keyboard, battery, hard disk, memory modules, CPU cooling fan, etc.

Some of the components of recent models of laptops reside inside. Replacing most of its components, such as keyboard, battery, hard disk, memory modules, CPU cooling fan, etc., requires removal of its either top or bottom part, removal of the motherboard, and returning them.

In some types, solder and glue are used to mount components such as RAM, storage, and batteries, making repairs additionally difficult.

Obsolete features

Features that certain early models of laptops used to have that are not available in most current laptops include:
 Reset ("cold restart") button in a hole (needed a thin metal tool to press)
 Instant power off button in a hole (needed a thin metal tool to press)
 Integrated charger or power adapter inside the laptop
 Dedicated Media buttons (Internet, Volume, Play, Pause, Next, Previous)
 Floppy disk drive
 Serial port
 Parallel port
 Modem
 IEEE 1394 port
 Docking port
 Shared PS/2 input device port
 IrDA
 S-video port
 S/PDIF audio port
 PC Card / PCMCIA slot
 ExpressCard slot
 CD/DVD Drives (starting with 2013 models)
 VGA port (starting with 2013 models)

Characteristics

Advantages

Portability is usually the first feature mentioned in any comparison of laptops versus desktop PCs. Physical portability allows a laptop to be used in many places—not only at home and the office but also during commuting and flights, in coffee shops, in lecture halls and libraries, at clients' locations or a meeting room, etc. Within a home, portability enables laptop users to move their devices from room to room. Portability offers several distinct advantages:
 Productivity: Using a laptop in places where a desktop PC cannot be used can help employees and students to increase their productivity on work or school tasks, such as an office worker reading their work e-mails during an hour-long commute by train, or a student doing their homework at the university coffee shop during a break between lectures, for example.
 Up-to-date information: Using a single laptop prevents fragmentation of files across multiple PC's as the files exist in a single location and are always up-to-date.
 Connectivity: A key advantage of laptops is that they almost always have integrated connectivity features such as Wi-Fi and Bluetooth, and sometimes connection to cellular networks either through native integration or use of a hotspot.  Wi-Fi networks and laptop programs are especially widespread at university campuses.

Other advantages of laptops:
 Size: Laptops are smaller than desktop PCs. This is beneficial when space is at a premium, for example in small apartments and student dorms. When not in use, a laptop can be closed and put away in a desk drawer.
 Low power consumption: Laptops are several times more power-efficient than desktops. A typical laptop uses 10–100 W, compared to 200–800W for desktops. This could be particularly beneficial for large businesses, which run hundreds of personal computers thus economies of scale, and homes where there is a computer running 24/7 (such as a home media server, print server, etc.).
 Quiet: Laptops are typically much quieter than desktops, due both to the components (often silent solid-state drives replacing hard drives) and to less heat production leading to the use of fewer, sometimes no cooling fans. The latter has given rise to laptops that have no moving parts, resulting in complete silence during use.
 Battery: a charged laptop can continue to be used in case of a power outage and is not affected by short power interruptions and blackouts, an issue that is present with desktop PC's.
 All-in-One: designed to be portable, most modern laptops have all components integrated into the chassis. For desktops (excluding all-in-ones) this is usually divided into the desktop "tower" (the unit with the CPU, hard drive, power supply, etc.), keyboard, mouse, display screen, and optional peripherals such as speakers.

Disadvantages
Compared to desktop PCs, laptops have disadvantages in the following areas:

Performance

The majority of laptops released in 2022 are capable of common tasks such as web browsing, video playback, and office applications, even at the low end. That said, performance of desktops often surpass comparably priced laptops. The upper limits of performance of laptops remain lower than desktops, due to mostly practical reasons, such as decreased battery life, increased size and heat, etc.

Upgradeability
The upgradeability of laptops is very limited compared to thoroughly standardized desktops, due to technical and economic reasons. In general, hard drives and memory can be upgraded easily. Due to the integrated nature of laptops, however, the motherboard, CPU, and graphics, are seldom officially upgradeable. Some efforts towards industry standard parts and layouts have been attempted, such as Common Building Block, but the industry remains largely proprietary and fragmented. There is no industry-wide standard form factor for laptops; Moreover, starting with 2013 models, laptops have become increasingly integrated (soldered) with the motherboard for most of its components (CPU, SSD, RAM, etc.) to reduce size and upgradeability prospects.

Ergonomics and health effects

Wrists
Prolonged use of laptops can cause repetitive strain injury because of their small, flat keyboard and trackpad pointing devices. Usage of separate, external ergonomic keyboards and pointing devices is recommended to prevent injury when working for long periods of time; they can be connected to a laptop easily by USB, Bluetooth or via a docking station. Some health standards require ergonomic keyboards at workplaces.

Neck and spine
A laptop's integrated screen often requires users to lean over for a better view, which can cause neck or spinal injuries. A larger and higher-quality external screen can be connected to almost any laptop to alleviate this and to provide additional screen space for more productive work. Another solution is to use a computer stand.

Possible effect on fertility
A study by State University of New York researchers found that heat generated from laptops can increase the temperature of the lap of male users when balancing the computer on their lap, potentially putting sperm count at risk. However, further research is needed to determine whether this directly affects male sterility. The resulting heat increase, which could not be offset by a laptop cushion, may increase male infertility.

A common practical solution to this problem is to place the laptop on a table or desk or to use a book or pillow between the body and the laptop. Another solution is to obtain a cooling unit for the laptop. These are usually USB powered and consist of a hard thin plastic case housing one, two, or three cooling fans – with the entire assembly designed to sit under the laptop in question – which results in the laptop remaining cool to the touch, and greatly reduces laptop heat buildup.

Thighs
Heat generated from using a laptop on the lap can also cause skin discoloration on the thighs known as "toasted skin syndrome".

Durability

Laptops are less durable than desktops/PCs. However, the durability of the laptop depends on the user if proper maintenance is done then the laptop can work longer.

Because of their portability, laptops are subject to more wear and physical damage than desktops, additionally hindered by their integrated nature. A liquid spill onto the keyboard, while a minor issue with a desktop system, can damage the internals of a laptop and destroy the computer, result in a costly repair or entire replacement of laptops. One study found that a laptop is three times more likely to break during the first year of use than a desktop. To maintain a laptop, it is recommended to clean it every three months for dirt, debris, dust, and food particles. Most cleaning kits consist of a lint-free or microfiber cloth for the screen and keyboard, compressed air for getting dust out of the cooling fan, and a cleaning solution. Harsh chemicals such as bleach should not be used to clean a laptop, as they can damage it.

Heating and cooling
Laptops rely on extremely compact cooling systems involving a fan and heat sink that can fail from blockage caused by accumulated airborne dust and debris. Most laptops do not have any type of removable dust collection filter over the air intake for these cooling systems, resulting in a system that gradually conducts more heat and noise as the years pass. In some cases, the laptop starts to overheat even at idle load levels. This dust is usually stuck inside where the fan and heat sink meet, where it can not be removed by a casual cleaning and vacuuming. Most of the time, compressed air can dislodge the dust and debris but may not entirely remove it. After the device is turned on, the loose debris is reaccumulated into the cooling system by the fans. Complete disassembly is usually required to clean the laptop entirely. However, preventative maintenance such as regular cleaning of the heat sink via compressed air can prevent dust build-up on the heat sink. Many laptops are difficult to disassemble by the average user and contain components that are sensitive to electrostatic discharge (ESD).

Battery life 
Battery life is limited because the capacity drops with time, eventually warranting replacement after as little as 2-3 years. A new battery typically stores enough energy to run the laptop for five to six hours or more, depending on usage and the battery size. The battery is often easily replaceable and a higher capacity model may be obtained for longer charging and discharging time. Some laptops do not have the usual removable battery and have to be brought to the service center of their manufacturer or a third-party laptop service center to have their battery replaced. Replacement batteries can also be expensive, depending on the availability of the parts.

Security and privacy

Because they are valuable, commonly used, portable, and easy to hide in a backpack or other type of bag, laptops are often stolen. Every day, over 1,600 laptops go missing from U.S. airports. The cost of stolen business or personal data, and of the resulting problems (identity theft, credit card fraud, breach of privacy), can be many times the value of the stolen laptop itself. Consequently, the physical protection of laptops and the safeguarding of data contained on them are both of great importance. Some laptops, primarily professional and educational devices, have a Kensington security slot, which can be used to tether them with a security cable and lock. In addition, modern operating systems have features such as Activation Lock or similar that prevents the use of the device without credentials. As of 2015, some laptops also have additional security elements added, including biometric security components such as Windows Hello or Touch ID.

Software such as GadgetTrak and  Find My Mac have been engineered to help people locate and recover their stolen laptops in the event of theft. Setting one's laptop with a password on its firmware (protection against going to firmware setup or booting), internal HDD/SSD (protection against accessing it and loading an operating system on it afterward), and every user account of the operating system are additional security measures that a user should do. Fewer than 5% of lost or stolen laptops are recovered by the companies that own them, however, that number may decrease due to a variety of companies and software solutions specializing in laptop recovery. In the 2010s, the common availability of webcams on laptops raised privacy concerns. In Robbins v. Lower Merion School District (Eastern District of Pennsylvania 2010), school-issued laptops loaded with special software enabled staff from two high schools to take secret webcam shots of students at home, via their students' laptops.

Sales

Manufacturers

There are many laptop brands and manufacturers. Several major brands that offer notebooks in various classes are listed in the adjacent box.
The major brands usually offer good service and support, including well-executed documentation and driver downloads that remain available for many years after a particular laptop model is no longer produced. Capitalizing on service, support, and brand image, laptops from major brands are more expensive than laptops by smaller brands and ODMs. Some brands specialize in a particular class of laptops, such as gaming laptops (Alienware), high-performance laptops (HP Envy), netbooks (EeePC) and laptops for children (OLPC).

Many brands, including the major ones, do not design and do not manufacture their laptops. Instead, a small number of Original Design Manufacturers (ODMs) design new models of laptops, and the brands choose the models to be included in their lineup. In 2006, 7 major ODMs manufactured 7 of every 10 laptops in the world, with the largest one (Quanta Computer) having 30% of the world market share. Therefore, identical models are available both from a major label and from a low-profile ODM in-house brand.

Adoption by users 
Battery-powered portable computers had just 2% worldwide market share in 1986. However, laptops have become increasingly popular, both for business and personal use. Around 109 million notebook PCs shipped worldwide in 2007, a growth of 33% compared to 2006. In 2008 it was estimated that 145.9 million notebooks were sold, and that the number would grow in 2009 to 177.7 million. The third quarter of 2008 was the first time when worldwide notebook PC shipments exceeded desktops, with 38.6 million units versus 38.5 million units. Due to the advent of tablets and affordable laptops, many computer users now have laptops due to the convenience offered by the device.

Price 
Before 2008, laptops were very expensive. Around 2008, however, prices of laptops decreased substantially due to low-cost netbooks, drawing an average  at U.S. retail stores in August 2008. Starting with the 2010's, laptops have decreased substantially in price at the low end due to inexpensive and low power Arm processors, less demanding operating systems such as ChromeOS, and SoC's. As of 2022, a new laptop can easily be obtained for

Disposal 

The list of materials that go into a laptop computer is long, and many of the substances used, such as beryllium, lead, chromium, and mercury compounds, are toxic or carcinogenic to humans. Although these toxins are relatively harmless when the laptop is in use, concerns that discarded laptops cause a serious health and environmental risks when improperly discarded have arisen. The Waste Electrical and Electronic Equipment Directive (WEEE Directive) in Europe specified that all laptop computers must be recycled by law. Similarly, the U.S. Environmental Protection Agency (EPA) has outlawed landfill dumping or the incinerating of discarded laptop computers.

Most laptop computers begin the recycling process with a method known as Demanufacturing, this involves the physical separation of the components of the laptop. These components are then either grouped into materials (e.g. plastic, metal and glass) for recycling or more complex items that require more advanced materials separation (e.g.) circuit boards, hard drives and batteries.

Corporate laptop recycling can require an additional process known as data destruction. The data destruction process ensures that all information or data that has been stored on a laptop hard drive can never be retrieved again. Below is an overview of some of the data protection and environmental laws and regulations applicable for laptop recycling data destruction:

 Data Protection Act 1998 (DPA)
 EU Privacy Directive (Due 2016)
 Financial Conduct Authority
 Sarbanes-Oxley Act
 PCI-DSS Data Security Standard
 Waste, Electronic & Electrical Equipment Directive (WEEE)
 Basel Convention
 Bank Secrecy Act (BSA)
 FACTA Sarbanes-Oxley Act
 FDA Security Regulations (21 C.F.R. part 11)
 Gramm-Leach-Bliley Act (GLBA)
 HIPAA (Health Insurance Portability and Accountability Act)
 NIST SP 800–53
 Add NIST SP 800–171
 Identity Theft and Assumption Deterrence Act
 Patriot Act of 2002
 PCI Data Security Standard
 US Safe Harbor Provisions
 Various state laws
 JAN 6/3
 Gramm-leach-Bliley Act
 DCID

Extreme use

The ruggedized Grid Compass computer was used since the early days of the Space Shuttle program. The first commercial laptop used in space was a Macintosh portable in 1990 on Space Shuttle mission STS-41 and again in 1991 aboard STS-43. Apple and other laptop computers continue to be flown aboard crewed spaceflights, though the only long-duration flight certified computer for the International Space Station is the ThinkPad. As of 2011, over 100 ThinkPads were aboard the ISS. Laptops used aboard the International Space Station and other spaceflights are generally the same ones that can be purchased by the general public but needed modifications are made to allow them to be used safely and effectively in a weightless environment such as updating the cooling systems to function without relying on hot air rising and accommodation for the lower cabin air pressure. Laptops operating in harsh usage environments and conditions, such as strong vibrations, extreme temperatures, and wet or dusty conditions differ from those used in space in that they are custom designed for the task and do not use commercial off-the-shelf hardware.

See also 

 List of computer size categories
 List of laptop brands and manufacturers
 Netbook
 Smartbook
 Chromebook
 Ultrabook
 Smartphone
 Subscriber Identity Module
 Mobile broadband
 Mobile Internet device (MID)
 Personal digital assistant
 VIA OpenBook
 Tethering
 XJACK
 Open-source computer hardware
 Novena
 Portal, a make of a French luggable accounting computer of 1980
 Mobile modem
 Stereoscopy glasses

Notes

References 

 

 
Classes of computers
Japanese inventions
Mobile computers
Office equipment
Personal computers
1980s neologisms